Vladimir Filipović (born July 28, 1985) is a Serbian professional basketball player who Knjaževac 1950 of the First Regional League of Serbia.

Professional career 
During his career, Filipović played for KK Zdravlje, KK Rabotnički, KK Ovce Pole, KK Pelister, Lirija KK Kozuv and KK Karpoš Sokoli.

On January 9, 2015, he signed with KK Kumanovo.

References

External links
 Profile at eurobasket.com
 Profile at balkanleague.net
 Profile at makdenes.org

1985 births
Living people
KK Zdravlje players
KK Fair Play players
Serbian expatriate basketball people in North Macedonia
Serbian men's basketball players
Sportspeople from Leskovac
Shooting guards